Stephen S. Mulkey was the CEO and President of Unity College located in Unity, Maine from 2011 to 2015. He also led a major divestment effort from fossil fuels and promoted sustainable construction on the college's campus.

References 

Living people
Year of birth missing (living people)
Place of birth missing (living people)
Unity College (Maine) faculty
American academic administrators